Elvalandet is an island in Trøndelag county, Norway. The  island is located in the municipalities of Namsos and Fosnes. It is located in the Lauvøyfjorden, just south of the island of Jøa, east of the island of Otterøya, and west of the mainland.

The island is connected to the mainland by a bridge on the Norwegian County Road 769.  There is a ferry connection on the north side of the island to the nearby island of Jøa.  Most of the island is forested.  The island is the 82nd largest island in Norway.

See also
List of islands of Norway

References

Islands of Trøndelag
Namsos